Kibbutz is a 2005 Israeli documentary directed by Racheli Schwartz about Kibbutz Hulata, where she lived for 30 years.

Schwartz follows various members, including her own family, over the course of five years, tracing the stages of grieving and disillusionment that follow the kibbutz's economic collapse and disintegration as the community reduces its communal commitment to its members.  Three older women from the founding generation become symbols of the kibbutz's lost ideals and abandoned history, as they die off, one by one.

For the director, the narrative is a very personal story and admits early on that “making the movie helped me to decide to stay.”

References

External links
Kibbutz at the Israeli Film Center
Look Back to Galilee: A Hundred Years of Communal Life (film review)

2005 films
2000s Hebrew-language films
Israeli documentary films
Films about the kibbutz